Indukurupeta is a village in Devipatnam Mandal, Alluri Sitharama Raju district in the state of Andhra Pradesh in India.

Geography 

Demographics 
 India census, Indukurupeta had a population of 3291, out of which 1624 were male and 1667 were female. The population of children below 6 years of age was 9%. The literacy rate of the village was 60%.

References 

Villages in Devipatnam mandal